Vinca may refer to:

 Vinca, one of two genera of plants with the common name Periwinkle
 Catharanthus a genus of flowering plants, the species of which are commonly called, as with Vinca species, Periwinkle 
 Catharanthus roseus, an annual bedding plant, formerly included in the Vinca genus as Vinca rosea. It shares its common name Periwinkle with Vinca species 
 Vinca, the Hungarian name for Vinţa village, Lupșa Commune, Alba County, Romania
 Vinça, a commune of the Pyrénées-Orientales département in France
 Vinca (software), a program to reverse VNC for remote support
 Vinca massacre, a massacre of 162 Italian civilians carried out by the 16th SS Panzergrenadier Division Reichsführer-SS

See also
 Vinča (disambiguation)